Black Foliage: Animation Music Volume One is the second studio album by American indie rock band The Olivia Tremor Control, released in 1999 through Flydaddy Records. It was re-released on vinyl in November 2011 through Chunklet.

The album's tone consists primarily of psychedelic rock deeply layered with various field recordings and found sounds with analog tape manipulation, as well as several noise collage tracks ranging in length from four seconds to over eleven minutes. There are five Black Foliage: Animation songs, which all feature the same melodic motif explored in several different directions, intertwined with heavy sonic experimentation. The album is heavily inspired by 1960's pop artists like The Beatles and The Beach Boys, particularly their later psychedelic work like Sgt. Pepper's Lonely Hearts Club Band and Pet Sounds, as well as the unreleased Smile.

Background
In the liner notes of their debut album Music from the Unrealized Film Script: Dusk at Cubist Castle, The Olivia Tremor Control asked their fans to send in tape recordings describing dreams they had, which are sampled in the album, most notably in "Combinations 2" and "Hilltop Procession (Momentum Gaining)". This request is also repeated in the liner notes for Black Foliage. According to band member Will Cullen Hart, the Animation tracks are intended to evoke imagery of animations.

Recording
According to the liner notes, Black Foliage was recorded on various 4 and 8 track tape between 1995 and 1998, with overdubs being recorded as the album was mixed over the course of 5 weeks in the summer of 1998 with producer Robert Schneider. These liner notes also detail that the band collaborated with many fellow members of The Elephant 6 Recording Company collective, including Neutral Milk Hotel frontman Jeff Mangum, who sings backup vocals in the song "I Have Been Floated".

The album also made use of several eclectic and bizarre instruments, with Elf Power keyboardist Laura Carter reminiscing on the group using a "guitar organ".

Critical reception

On the review site Metacritic, Black Foliage earned a rating of 75 out of 100, indicating "generally positive reviews". Writing for Pitchfork, Paul Thompson described it as "among the most satisfying psychedelic albums of any decade", going on to compare it to the Buddhist concept of Bardo. Matt LeMay, a writer for the A.V. Club favorably described the Chunklet re-issues as "bringing [Black Foliage's] remarkable complexity into greater focus".

Track listing
All songs written by the Olivia Tremor Control.
Side one

Side two

Side three

Side four

Note: Track 21, "California Demise, Pt. 3" contains a small skip.  The flaw was noticed during playback of the master recording in the studio, and the band decided to leave it in since it was a semi-ironic flaw, as it occurs on the lyric, "already".

References

1999 albums
The Olivia Tremor Control albums